The Up North Combine is an amalgamation of 22 pigeon racing Federations founded in 1905. Its headquarters are located at Sappers Corner in Greatham, Hartlepool, and the radius of serving federations go from Staithes (south) to Berwick (north). The combine is affiliated to and governed by the rules of the North of England Homing Union(NEHU).  

The organisation was featured in a 1969 documentary, Time on the Wing, made by Turners Film Productions for Vaux Breweries on pigeon fancying and pigeon racing in the North East of England.  This showed  officials and convoy organisers discuss arrangements for the trip to the Vaux-Usher International Gold Tankard Pigeon Race which involved the transport of some 19,000 birds. 

Tommy Newton of the Houghton Federation was the owner of the winner of the first race from Lille they organised in 2000, the first winner from that club since 1938.

Officials
President/Chairman: Mr J.Thompson
Senior Vice President: Mr C Rowson
Vice presidents: Mr J Luke, Mr T Young, Mr M Elliot, Mr T Callen, Mr D Geach 
Secretary: Mrs P. Grange
Convoyer: Mr S. Profitt

List of affiliated federations
Border Federation
Coquetdale Federation
East Celeveland Federation
Gateshead Federation
Hartlepool Federation
Hetton Federation
Houghton Federation
Mid Tyne Federation

Middlesbrough Federation
Newcastle West Federation
North East Counties Federation
North Yorkshire Federation
Northumberland Premier Federation
Shotton & Trimdon Federation
 
South East Durham Federation
South Shields Federation
Sunderland & District Federation
Sunderland Premier Federation
Teesside Federation
Tees Valley Federation
Tynemouth Federation
Wansbeck Federation

Members
As of 2017 the combine had 23 Federations affiliated, 120 clubs affiliated and 2614 members.

External links
 Up North Combine website

References

Pigeon racing
Organisations based in the Borough of Hartlepool